Phellodon putidus is a species of tooth fungus in the family Bankeraceae. Found in North America, it was first described scientifically by George F. Atkinson as Hydnum putidum in 1900. Howard James Banker transferred it to the genus Phellodon in 1906.

References

External links

Fungi described in 1900
Fungi of North America
putidus